Anning is both a surname and a masculine given name. Notable people with the name include:

Surname:
Fraser Anning (born 1949), Australian politician
Les Anning (1927–2008), Canadian ice hockey player
Mary Anning (1799–1847), British fossil collector, dealer, and paleontologist
Norman H. Anning (1883–1963), American mathematician and academic
Raymon Anning (born 1930), Hong Kong police commissioner
Trevor Anning (born 1982), English cricketer

Given name:
Anning Smith Prall (1870–1937), American politician

Masculine given names